Britt Davis (born April 23, 1986) is a former American football wide receiver. He was signed by the New York Jets as an undrafted free agent in 2009. He played college football at Northern Illinois.

Early years
Davis attended public schools in North Riverside, Illinois.  He went to Komarek Elementary School and Riverside-Brookfield High School. At RBHS he amassed 7,700 career yards total offense and 90 touchdowns in 22 starts as quarterback on two state Class 5A playoff teams. He completed 461-of-766 passes (60.2%) for 6,266 yards, 39 touchdowns and 21 interceptions. He posted nine career 300-yard passing games. He also added 17 rushing touchdowns and 1,434 rushing yards on 163 attempts.

College career
Davis attended college at Northern Illinois University.  As a member of the Huskies, he was used almost exclusively as a wide receiver position, Even though originally being recruited for the quarterback position, and finished his career at NIU as fifth on the school all-time charts for career receptions with 146 and totaled 1,676 career receiving yards and 2,063 all-purpose yards. He also completed two-of-four passes and rushed 15 times for 66 yards, and scored nine career touchdowns, eight receiving for 56 total points. He earned a corporate communications major with a minor in black studies.

Professional career

New York Jets

Davis went undrafted in the 2009 NFL Draft and was signed by the New York Jets. He had 5 receptions for 54 yards in the preseason, and was waived on September 5. The Jets re-signed Davis to their practice squad on November 17. Davis, who had been signed to a future contract earlier in the season, was later waived on August 1, 2010 by the Jets.

Denver Broncos
Davis signed with the Denver Broncos on August 5, 2010 for a two-year deal.

New England Patriots
Davis was signed to the New England Patriots practice squad on January 4, 2012. He was waived with an injury settlement on August 13, 2012, after sustaining an injury in a preseason game against the New Orleans Saints in which he caught a touchdown from Brian Hoyer.

References

External links
Northern Illinois Huskies Bio
A Huskie Forever
nfldraftscout

1986 births
Living people
People from Melrose Park, Illinois
People from Riverside, Illinois
Players of American football from Illinois
American football wide receivers
Northern Illinois Huskies football players
New York Jets players
Denver Broncos players